Espeh Riz (also Romanized as Espeh Rīz; also known as Asbriz, Asparāz, Asparīz, Asperīz, Aspīrāz, Asp-i-Riz, and Esperīz) is a village in Shalyar Rural District, Uraman District, Sarvabad County, Kurdistan Province, Iran. At the 2006 census, its population was 20, in 7 families. The village is populated by Kurds.

References 

Towns and villages in Sarvabad County
Kurdish settlements in Kurdistan Province